IAPS may refer to:

 Indian Army Public Schools
 International Academy for Philosophy of Science
 International Affective Picture System, a set of affective/emotional images used in psychological research
 International Association of Physics Students, a non-profit umbrella organization for physics students associations worldwide
 Independent Association of Prep Schools, a professional association for headteachers of independent preparatory schools in the UK and worldwide
 ; see 1990s president Robert Austin Markus
 Istituto di Astrofisica e Planetologia Spaziali, a research institute in Rome, Italy; part of the Italian National Institute for Astrophysics (INAF)

See also
 IAP (disambiguation)